Chen Jiru (1558–1639) was a Chinese landscape painter, calligrapher and essayist during the Ming dynasty (1368–1644).

Chen was born in Huating (华亭; present-day Songjiang District, Shanghai). His courtesy name was Zhongchun (仲醇) and his pseudonyms were Migong (麋公) and Meigong (眉公). Chen's calligraphy followed the style of Su Shi and Mi Fu. Chen also painted landscapes and elegant still lifes.

In 1595 he wrote Tea Talks (茶董補), still often quoted in China and Japan, and he studied pottery and created purple clay teapots in the Yixing style. His Shallow Comments on the Art of Nourishing Life as well as A Gentleman's Remarks on Diet were a reference for many years.

He was a notable author of the xiaopin, a form of short literary essay.

Chen Jiru left an autobiography which contains a "patently fictitious account of the circumstances of his own death, a most extraordinary innovation," writes the modern scholar Pei-yi Wu, describing Chen as "a member of the literati known for his versatile artistic talents."

In 2007, Jamie Greenbaum, a researcher at the University of Beijing, published a book on Chen Jiru's writings which provides an overview of his larger-than-life personality, as well as an account of the different literary personae he invented.

References

Bibliography 
 Ci hai bian ji wei yuan hui (辞海编辑委员会. Ci hai  (辞海. Shanghai: Shanghai ci shu chu ban she  (上海辞书出版社), 1979.
 
 Mair, Victor H. (ed.) (2001). The Columbia History of Chinese Literature. New York: Columbia University Press. . (Amazon Kindle edition.)

External links
 

1558 births
1639 deaths
Painters from Shanghai
Ming dynasty calligraphers
Ming dynasty landscape painters
Chinese autobiographers
Writers from Shanghai
Ming dynasty essayists
Chinese tea masters
17th-century Chinese calligraphers
16th-century Chinese calligraphers
17th-century Chinese philosophers
Ming dynasty people